Edward Rudolph "Butch" Warren Jr. (August 9, 1939 – October 5, 2013) was an American jazz bassist who was active during the 1950s and 1960s.

Biography
Warren's mother was a typist at the CIA. His father, Edward Sr., was an electronics technician who played piano and organ part-time in clubs in Washington, D.C; his uncle, Quentin — actually the same age as Butch — played guitar. The Warren home was often visited by jazz musicians Billy Hart, Jimmy Smith, and Stuff Smith. The first time Butch Warren played bass was at home on an instrument left by Billy Taylor, who had played bass for Duke Ellington. Warren has cited Jimmy Blanton, the innovative and virtuoso bassist with Ellington from 1939 to 1941, as his biggest inspiration.

Warren began playing professionally at age 14 in a Washington, D.C. band led by his father. He later worked with other local groups, including that of Stuff Smith, as well as with altoist and bandleader Rick Henderson at the Howard Theatre.

When he was 19, he sat in with Kenny Dorham to substitute for an absent bassist. A few days later, Dorham invited him to New York City, where he spent the next six months as a sideman at a club in Brooklyn. He appeared on his first recording in January 1960 with Dorham, saxophonist Charles Davis, pianist Tommy Flanagan, and drummer Buddy Enlow. Through his friendship with Sonny Clark, he recorded for Blue Note Records in 1961 on Clark's album Leapin' and Lopin. Alfred Lion, producer at Blue Note, hired Warren to fill the vacancy of staff bassist. During this job he played on "Watermelon Man" with Herbie Hancock. As sideman, he also recorded with Miles Davis, Hank Mobley, Donald Byrd, Dexter Gordon, Joe Henderson, Jackie McLean, and Stanley Turrentine.

Mental illness and heroin addiction created problems for Warren. In 1963, his friend Sonny Clark died of an overdose. Months later, Thelonious Monk hired the 23-year-old Warren. Monk's band was surrounded by drugs and Warren quit after a yearlong tour. Moving back to D.C., he admitted himself to St. Elizabeths Hospital. He was diagnosed with paranoid schizophrenia.

Following the onset of his illness he played professionally only occasionally, including a regular gig at the jazz club Columbia Station in Washington D.C.

His only solo effort was captured on "Butch's Blues" but he was better known as a sideman on many albums, including Dexter Gordon's Go.

He died of lung cancer in Silver Spring, Maryland at the age of 74.

Discography

As leader
2011: Butch Warren French Quintet - with Pierrick Menuau (saxophone), Pierre Christophe (piano), Mourad Benhammou (drums) and Jean Philippe Bordier (guitar)
2021: Butch Warren & Freddie Redd: Baltimore Jazz Loft- with Matt Wilson (drums) and Brad Linde (tenor saxophone) Bleebop Records (recorded 2013)

As sideman
With Donald Byrd
1961: Royal Flush
1961: Free Form
1963: A New Perspective

With Kenny Dorham
1960: The Kenny Dorham Memorial Album
1960: Jazz Contemporary
1963: Una Mas

With Dexter Gordon
1962: Go
1962: A Swingin' Affair

With Jackie McLean
1959: Vertigo
1961: A Fickle Sonance
1962: Tippin' the Scales
1967: Hipnosis

With Hank Mobley
1963: No Room for Squares
1963: The Turnaround
1963: Straight No Filter

With Thelonious Monk
1963: Miles & Monk at Newport
1963: Big Band and Quartet in Concert
1963: Monk in Tokyo
1964: It's Monk's Time

With others
 1961: Leapin' and Lopin' – Sonny Clark
 1961: High Hope! – Elmo Hope
 1962: Takin' Off – Herbie Hancock
 1962: Preach Brother! – Don Wilkerson
 1962: Jubilee Shout!!! – Stanley Turrentine
 1962: Feelin' the Spirit – Grant Green
 1962: Exodus – Slide Hampton
 1963: Happy Frame of Mind – Horace Parlan
 1963: Exultation! – Booker Ervin
 1963: Page One – Joe Henderson
 1964: Holiday Soul – Bobby Timmons
 1965: The Walter Bishop Jr. Trio / 1965 – Walter Bishop, Jr.

References

External links
Official site archived

1939 births
2013 deaths
American jazz double-bassists
Male double-bassists
Bebop double-bassists
Musicians from Washington, D.C.
People with schizophrenia
American male jazz musicians